Dhenkanal district is one of the 30 districts of the state of Odisha in Eastern India.

Geography

Dhenkanal district is one of the centrally located districts in Odisha. It lies between Longitude: 85° 58' to 86° 2' East and Latitude: 20° 29' to 21° 11' North. The nearest airport is Biju Patnaik Airport located at a distance of 52.12 Km. It is bordered by Kendujhar and Angul districts to the north, Jajpur district to the east, Cuttack district to the south and Angul district to the west.

The district comprises mainly plains, however there are several discontinuous hill ranges in the district and along its southern border. The Brahmani River is the main river of the district.

Demographics

According to the 2011 census Dhenkanal district has a population of 1,192,811, roughly equal to the nation of Timor-Leste or the US state of Rhode Island. This gives it a ranking of 400th in India (out of a total of 640). Its population growth rate over the decade 2001–2011 was 11.82%. Dhenkanal has a sex ratio of 947 females for every 1000 males, and a literacy rate of 79.41%. Scheduled Castes and Scheduled Tribes made up 19.62% and 13.59% of the population respectively.

At the time of the 2011 Census of India, 96.17% of the population in the district spoke Odia, 1.24% Munda, 0.91% Santali and 0.48% Juang as their first language.

Education
Dhenkanal is home to the Indian Institute of Mass Communication, the only institute in Odisha for the study of journalism and mass communication.

Other colleges and schools, universities, and institutes include:
  Jawahar Navodaya vidyalaya, Sarang, dhenkanal
 Synergy Institute of Engineering & Technology
 Indira Gandhi Institute of Technology
 Dhenkanal College
 Dhenkanal Law College

Politics

Vidhan sabha constituencies

Dhenkanal has four Vidhan sabha constituencies within the Dhenkanal parliamentary (Lok Sabha) constituency. The elected MLAs from Dhenkanal district are:

Notable people
Nandini Satpathy
 Kamakhya Prasad Singh Deo
 Suparno Satpathy
 Devendra Satpathy
 Tathagata Satpathy
 Kalpana Dash

See also
Dhirapatana
Karamul

References

External links

 

 
1948 establishments in India
Districts of Odisha